Erandique is a municipality in the Lempira Department of Honduras.

Erandique is one of the several municipalities of the Lempira department. One has to travel  on road CA11A from the city of Gracias passing by San Juan (del Caite). A second road (V-787) that leads to Erandique is going by the town of "Dolores" in Intibuca. Also this roads leads to the municipality of San Francisco. The main disadvantage of this second road is that is not repaired often. If one enters from San Juan, Erandique has one exit to San Francisco and the other to the rest of the municipalities such as San Andrés and so on.

History 

Erandique was founded in 1600 under the name of "Cerquin", due to its location on the west of the Cerquin hill. It was registered in 1733 in the volume II of the Real State book, dated on 28 November. According to tales from elderly citizens, the original act was lost and it was replaced on 14 February 1882, in the administration of Dr Marco Aurelio Soto. Erandique is one of the oldest municipalities and it became a city on 3 March 1932.

Geography 

Erandique is still surrounded by pine forests, with some pockets of Sweetgum (Liquidambar) trees. The terrain is rugged, characterised by steep hills. The weather is cool during the rainy season (May–October), and warmer in the dry season. The predominant soil is derived from volcanic rocks. During the rainy season, this soil that forms from the degradation of the rocks becomes extremely slippery, and it is common for unpaved roads to wash away and for routes to become impassable. Many of the pine forests are still used as a source of biofuel for the local population.

Boundaries 
Its boundaries are: 
North : Santa Cruz municipality and Intibuca department.
South : Piraera and San Francisco municipalities.
East  : Intibuca department.
West  : San Andrés and Gualcince municipalities.
Surface Extents: 294 km²

Resources 

The coffee plantations have great importance to Erandique, but they are located in the villages and mountains at higher elevations around the city centre, such as "Cerquin" hill. Therefore, it is a gathering point of coffee and it also processes the grains. Following coffee, there is also agricultural production of corn and beans, as well as some vegetable crops and small herds of cattle. Currently there is electricity and telecommunications services from the national company and mobile phone services. It is very important to tell that a small hospital works in Erandique. It has an ambulance service and the serious cases are taken to Gracias. It is worth mentioning that a group of US volunteers runs a small clinic to help the poorest citizens. Daily bus service available to both Gracias and La Esperanza once per day. There is one gas station and several places to fix flat tires.

Population 
Half of the population in Erandique are descended from native Indians. The other half of the population is mestizo (mixed-race ). During the holidays and other activities is when the direct descendants are seen; they still prefer to live isolated.

Population: The figure was 11,700 in 2001. An estimate was based on this, to have the figure of 13,845 people for 2008.
Villages: 15
Settlements: 132

Demographics
At the time of the 2013 Honduras census, Erandique municipality had a population of 15,242. Of these, 80.26% were Indigenous (80.17% Lenca), 18.34% Mestizo, 0.69% Black or Afro-Honduran, 0.52% White and 0.19% others.

Tourism 

The landscapes in Erandique are considered beautiful around the country due to the pine and sweetgum (Liquidambar) forests. The people from Erandique are nice and welcoming. There are a couple of places for internet access. There are also several places to enjoy the typical food and only one that offers more variety of dishes, such as shrimps and seafood soup, since some come from the coastal city of La Ceiba. Downtown the visitor can see many old adobe houses. Some streets are paved with rocks and there are 2 very old churches to visit.

Local Holidays: "San Sebastian" day on 20 January. "Virgen de La Merced" on 8 September, "San Antonio" on 13 June. Also on 20 July it is celebrated "Lempira" national day for the first national hero who fought the Spanish conquerors.

Gallery

References

Municipalities of the Lempira Department